Peter Huchel (April 3, 1903 – April 30, 1981), born Hellmut Huchel, was a German poet and editor.

Life

Huchel was born in Lichterfelde (now part of Berlin). From 1923 to 1926, Huchel studied literature and philosophy in Berlin, Freiburg and Vienna. Between 1927 and 1930, he travelled to France, Romania, Hungary and Turkey. In 1930, he changed his first name to Peter and befriended Ernst Bloch, Alfred Kantorowicz and Fritz Sternberg. His early poems, published from 1931 to 1936, are strongly marked by the atmosphere and landscape of Brandenburg. In 1934, Huchel married Dora Lassel. The couple would divorce in 1946 and Huchel would marry Monica Rosental in 1953. Between 1934 and 1940, Huchel wrote plays for German radio. During the Second World War, he served as a soldier until he was taken prisoner by the Russians in 1945. After his release, he began working for East German radio and in 1949, he became editor of the influential poetry magazine Sinn und Form ("Sense and Form"). After the building of the Berlin Wall in 1961, Huchel came under attack from the East German authorities and the following year he was forced to resign the editorshop of Sinn und Form. From 1962 to 1971, he lived in isolation under Stasi surveillance in his house in Wilhelmshorst near Berlin. In 1971, he was finally permitted to leave the German Democratic Republic and move, first to Rome, then to Staufen im Breisgau, where he later died. The poem and song "Ermutigung", written by his friend Wolf Biermann in 1968, was dedicated to Huchel.

Works

Gedichte (Poems) (1948)
Chausseen, Chausseen. Gedichte (1963)
Die Sternenreuse. Gedichte 1925–1947 (1968)
Gezählte Tage. Gedichte (1972)
Die neunte Stunde. Gedichte (1979)
Gesammelte Werke (Collected Works); 2 vols., Vol. 1: Poems, Vol. 2: Miscellaneous Writings; ed. Axel Vieregg, Frankfurt am Main, 1984
Wie will man da Gedichte schreiben. Briefe 1925–1977 (How could someone write poems under such circumstances? Letters) ed. Hub Nijssen, Frankfurt am Main, 2000
A Thistle In His Mouth. Poems by Peter Huchel, selected, translated and introduced by Henry Beissel. Cormorant Books, Dunvegan, Ontario 1987.*
On Crutches of Naked Poplars. Translated by Robert Firmage. Mid-American Review Vol. XI, Nr. 1, 1991, p. 137–187.*
The Garden of Theophrastus and other poems. Translated by Michael Hamburger. Cheadle 1983. Again: Anvill Press 2004*
Peter Huchel. Selected Poems. Translated by Michael Hamburger. Cheadle 1974.*

References
This article is based on material from the German Wikipedia.

External links
Translation of December 1942
the Huchel.House in Potsdam-Wilhelmshorst
Translation of Eastern River
Translation of Meeting
Translation of Melpomene
 translation of Answer
translation of Roads
Translation of Snow

1903 births
1981 deaths
Writers from Berlin
East German writers
20th-century German poets
German male poets
German-language poets
20th-century German male writers
Recipients of the Pour le Mérite (civil class)
Knights Commander of the Order of Merit of the Federal Republic of Germany
People from Steglitz-Zehlendorf